Kitty Cooper (born 1950) is an American bridge player and genetic genealogist originally from New York City,  now from San Diego. As a player in important bridge tournaments, she has been known also as Kitty Bethe, Kitty Munson, and Kitty Munson Cooper.

Bridge accomplishments

Wins

 Venice Cup (1) 1989
 North American Bridge Championships (8)
 Rockwell Mixed Pairs (1) 1992
 Senior and Advanced Senior Master Pairs (1) 1975
 Machlin Women's Swiss Teams (1) 1989
 Wagar Women's Knockout Teams (1) 1998
 Keohane North American Swiss Teams (3) 1987, 1990, 2000
 Senior Mixed Pairs (1) 2012

Runners-up

 Venice Cup (1) 1995
 North American Bridge Championships (8)
 Rockwell Mixed Pairs (1) 2006
 Whitehead Women's Pairs (2) 1998, 2014
 Machlin Women's Swiss Teams (2) 1984, 1994
 Sternberg Women's Board-a-Match Teams (1) 1988
 Chicago Mixed Board-a-Match (2) 1998, 2000

References

External links
 
 Kitty Cooper's national record at the American Contract Bridge League

1950 births
American contract bridge players
Venice Cup players
Writers from New York City
Living people
Place of birth missing (living people)
Date of birth missing (living people)
American genealogists
Historians from New York (state)